Rubens Rodrigues dos Santos Júnior or simply Rubens Júnior (born January 8, 1975) is a former Brazilian left back. On 25 January 2004 whilst playing for Vitória de Guimarães, he played in a 1–0 home loss against Benfica, a game overshadowed by the death of Benfica's Miklós Fehér.

Honours

Palmeiras
 Copa Libertadores: 1999

Atlético Paranaense
 Paraná State League: 2000

Porto
 Portuguese Cup: 1999–2000, 2000–01
 Portuguese SuperCup: 1999, 2001

External links
 CBF
 globoesporte
 zerozero.pt
 Guardian Stats Centre
 sambafoot

1975 births
Living people
People from Taubaté
Brazilian footballers
Brazilian expatriate footballers
Primeira Liga players
Esporte Clube Taubaté players
Clube Atlético Bragantino players
Guarani FC players
Coritiba Foot Ball Club players
FC Porto players
Botafogo de Futebol e Regatas players
Vitória S.C. players
Sport Club Corinthians Paulista players
CR Vasco da Gama players
Copa Libertadores-winning players
Expatriate footballers in Portugal
Association football defenders
Footballers from São Paulo (state)